NGC 39 (also known as UGC 114, MCG 5-1-52, ZWG 499.76  or PGC 852) is an unbarred spiral galaxy in the constellation Andromeda. It was discovered in 1790.

References

External links
 
 
 NGC 39
 seds.org

Unbarred spiral galaxies
Andromeda (constellation)
0039
00852
00114
17901102